Moelven Idrettslag is a Norwegian multi-sports club located in Moelv, Hedmark, founded on 25 June 1918 as Fotballgruppa Trygg. It has sections for athletics, handball, football, skiing and gymnastics.

The men's football team currently plays in the Third Division, the fourth tier of Norwegian football.

Among the prominent members of the athletics section are Jan Langøy and Mauritz Kåshagen.

References

External links
 Official website

Football clubs in Norway
Sports clubs established in 1918
Association football clubs established in 1918
Athletics clubs in Norway
Sport in Hedmark
Ringsaker
1918 establishments in Norway